Matías Nicolás Rojas Romero (born 3 November 1995) is a Paraguayan professional footballer who plays as an attacking midfielder for Argentine Primera División side Racing Club and the Paraguay national football team.

Club career
Rojas' first club in his career was Cerro Porteño. He made his debut for the Paraguayan Primera División club in March 2014 during a defeat to Nacional. A year later, Rojas netted his first senior goal on 13 March 2015 as Cerro Porteño beat Deportivo Capiatá 3–2 at the Estadio Defensores del Chaco. One further goal, against Sportivo Luqueño, followed as Rojas featured thirty-four times across 2015 and 2016. On 10 January 2017, Rojas was loaned to Lanús of the Argentine Primera División. He remained for seventeen months, making eighteen appearances and scoring once; in the Copa Argentina.

Rojas arrived back to Cerro Porteño on 30 June 2018, but returned to Argentina on loan weeks later after agreeing to join fellow Argentine Primera División side Defensa y Justicia. He scored on his first start, netting an equaliser in a 1–1 draw with Belgrano. Rojas departed Cerro Porteño permanently in June 2019, staying in Argentina after signing terms with Racing Club of the Primera División.

International career
On 2 March 2019, Rojas received a call-up to the Paraguay national team from Eduardo Berizzo ahead of that month's friendlies with Peru and Mexico. He made his debut on 22 March in the game against Peru, as a 66th-minute substitute for Cecilio Domínguez. Berizzo subsequently selected Rojas in his preliminary squad for the 2019 Copa América on 13 May, before making the official tournament squad on 29 May.

Career statistics

Club
.

International
.

Honours
Cerro Porteño
Paraguayan Primera División (2): 2015 Apertura, 2017 Clausura

References

External links

1995 births
Living people
Sportspeople from Asunción
Paraguayan footballers
Paraguay international footballers
Association football midfielders
Paraguayan expatriate footballers
Expatriate footballers in Argentina
Paraguayan expatriate sportspeople in Argentina
Paraguayan Primera División players
Argentine Primera División players
Cerro Porteño players
Club Atlético Lanús footballers
Defensa y Justicia footballers
Racing Club de Avellaneda footballers
2019 Copa América players